Vittorio Prodi (born 19 May 1937 in Reggio Emilia) is an Italian politician who served as a Member of the European Parliament from 2004 until 2014. He is a member of the Progressive Alliance of Socialists and Democrats.

In parliament, Prodi served on the Committee on Industry, Research and Energy. He was also a substitute for the Committee on the Environment, Public Health and Food Safety, a member of the Delegation for relations with the United States and a substitute for the Delegation for relations with the People's Republic of China. He represented the Parliament at the 2008 United Nations Climate Change Conference in Poznań, Poland.

He is one of Romano Prodi's 8 siblings.

Career
 1959: Graduated in physics at the University of Bologna
 1970: lecturer in nuclear measurements
 since 1983: associate professor in the Physics Department of the University of Bologna
 1995-2004: President of the Province of Bologna
 2001-2004: Member of the provincial representation of the Conference 'State - Cities - Local Governments' and of the 'Unified Conference' (State, Cities, local governments and Regions)
 Author of numerous publications and of five international patents

See also
 2004 European Parliament election in Italy

References

External links
 
 
 
 

1937 births
Living people
People from Reggio Emilia
Presidents of the Province of Bologna
20th-century Italian physicists
Democratic Party (Italy) MEPs
Democratic Party (Italy) politicians
MEPs for Italy 2009–2014
MEPs for Italy 2004–2009
21st-century Italian politicians